Aliabad (also Romanized as ‘Alīābād) is a village in Dehmolla Rural District, in the Central District of Shahrud County, Semnan Province, Iran. At the 2006 census, its population was 166, in 64 families.

References 

Populated places in Shahrud County